The 1912 South Carolina Gamecocks football team represented the University of South Carolina as an independent during the 1912 college football season. Led by first-year Norman B. Edgerton, the Gamecocks compiled a record of 5–2–1. The team won the mythical state championship of South Carolina.

Schedule

References

South Carolina
South Carolina Gamecocks football seasons
South Carolina Gamecocks football